The Council of Serdica, or Synod of Serdica (also Sardica located in modern day Sofia, Bulgaria), was a synod convened in 343 at Serdica in the civil diocese of Dacia, by Emperors Constans I, augustus in the West, and Constantius II, augustus in the East. It attempted to resolve the Arian controversy, and was attended by about 170 bishops. It was convened by the two augusti at the request of Pope Julius I.

Background
The first ecumenical council (Nicaea I) canon 5 decreed that bishops should convene in biannual synods within every province to act as a court of second instance and review cases with excommunication sentences pronounced by individual bishops. But, there was no appeal to a court of final instance "if an unjust sentence was imposed" by a provincial synod acting as a court of second instance. Nicaea I canon 5 "implied that" provincial synods "had an acknowledged authority to" judge the acts of individual bishops of their province. Provincial synods' authority "was becoming well established in the East" prior to the council of Serdica. In 341, the Synod of Antioch canons 14 and 15 "were designed both to augment the authority of the provincial synod as a trial court and to ensure the integrity of its operation."

Athanasius of Alexandria was deposed and excommunicated by Eusebians at the first Synod of Tyre (Tyre I) in 335.

Athanasius was exiled from Egypt in 339.

Athanasius appealed the Tyre I sentence to Julius I.

Julius I summoned the Eastern bishops to Rome in 340 to review the Tyre I sentence.

The Eastern bishops rejected the review of the Tyre I sentence and formulated a new creed at the Synod of Antioch in 341.

Constans I and Julius I commissioned Bishop Hosius of Cordova, who previously presided over Nicaea I, to preside over the council.

Hosius and other bishops desired final judgments in the cases of Athanasius and other bishops who had been alternately condemned and vindicated by councils in the East and the West. They also desired to definitively settle the confusion arising from the many doctrinal formulas in circulation, and suggested that all such matters should be referred to an ecumenical council. In order to make the council thoroughly representative, Serdica was chosen as the meeting location.

In 340 Athanasius of Alexandria was expelled from his diocese by the Arians. After spending three years in Rome, Athanasius went to Gaul to confer with Hosius. From there, they went to the Council of Serdica, which began in the summer, or, at latest, in the autumn of 343.

Proceedings
Hosius presided over the council of about 170 bishops, of whom about 90 were mostly of the Western Homoousian faction and about 80 were mostly of the Eastern Eusebian faction. It probably convened in 343.

Julius I was represented by the priests Archidamus and Philoxenus, and the deacon Leo. Athanasius reported that bishops attended from Roman diocese of Hispania, Gaul, Britain, Italy, Africa, Egypt, Syria, Thrace and Pannonia. 96 Western bishops attended the council; those from the East were less numerous. Constantius II was represented by Strategius Musonianus and Hesychius of Antioch.

Being in the minority, the Eastern bishops decided to act as a body, and, fearing defections, they all lodged in the same place. On the ground of being unwilling to recognize Athanasius, Marcellus of Ancyra and Asclepas of Gaza, who had been excommunicated in Eastern synods, the Eastern bishops refused to sit in council with the Western bishops. Hosius attempted a compromise by inviting them to privately present their complaints against Athanasius to him, and by promising, in case Athanasius should be acquitted, to take him to Spain. Hosius' overtures failed. The Eastern bishops – although the council had been called expressly for the purpose of re-examining the cases of those who had been excommunicated – defended their conduct on the plea that one council could not revise the decisions of another. Fearing domination of the council by Western bishops, many dissident bishops left the council to hold another, the Council of Philippopolis, where they composed an encyclical and a new creed, which was dated from Serdica.

After the dissident bishops abandoned the council, the bishops who remained at Serdica re-examined the cases of Athanasius, Marcellus, and Asclepas. No new investigation of charges against Athanasius was considered necessary, as these had already been rejected, and he and the other two bishops, who were permitted to present exculpatory documents, were declared innocent. In addition to this, censure was passed on the Eastern bishops for having abandoned the council, and several of them were deposed and excommunicated.

The question of a new creed containing some additions to that of Nicaea was discussed, but the bishops decided to add nothing to the accepted creed, and thus gave the Arians no pretext for saying that hitherto they had not been explicitly condemned. Though the form of a proposed creed was presented to the council, it was inserted in the encyclical addressed by the council to "all the bishops of the Catholic Church".

Canons
Before separating, the bishops promulgated approximately 20 canons, especially about the transfer of bishops and about trials and appeals of bishops. These canons and other conciliar documents were sent to Julius with a letter signed by the majority of the bishops. The canons were originally composed in Greek and both Greek and Latin versions are extant. The canons are "now universally accepted" as genuine.

In addition to the attempt to resolve the Arian issue, other major points were:
Canon 1: "corruption must be done away with from its foundation." Bishops must not move from his own city to another more populated place because those men who move "are serving ambition and aiming at the possession of power." Bishops who move from their own city are to be punished sternly and "shall not even be admitted to lay communion."
Canon 2: if "it is evident that a few persons could have been" bribed "to raise an uproar in the church, and seem to ask for the said man as bishop," then those, who "allege as an excuse and affirm that" the candidate to the office of bishop "received letters from the people," "must be condemned" as frauds and "should not receive" communion even when dying. Aléxios Aristinos commented that this penalty – denying communion as a last rite – is not imposed anywhere else by any canon or for any sin.
Canon 6: bishops should be ordained based on necessity and appointed to populous cities and not to small towns or villages where one presbyter suffices.
Canon 8: bishops should not go to a court of a Roman Emperor, unless invited or summoned by imperial letters, except to petition for the good of the church, or for succour and pardon of those suffering from an injustice or a sentence of deportation.

Episcopal candidates
Canon 10a: a man shall not be ordained a bishop before he has "fulfilled the ministry of a reader and the office of deacon and presbyter." These promotions take considerable time and can test "his faith, his discretion, his gravity and modesty." Let him be ordained a bishop after he is found worthy. Order and discipline forbids a novice from being ordained bishop, presbyter, or deacon, since Paul of Tarsus had forbidden it. Men "whose life has been tested and their merit approved by length of time" should be ordained.

Right of appeal 
The  – 3b, 3c, 4, 7 – along with canon 17 "provided recourse to assistance by the bishop of Rome for bishops who claimed unfair treatment from judgement by their peers."

: if a bishop is the complainant in a case against another bishop of his province, neither the complainant nor the accused can ask a bishop from another province to judge the case.
: if a bishop is convicted of an offence by a verdict in a case, and if the convicted bishop objects to the verdict and seeks recourse by asking for reconsideration, then the bishops who judged the case – the trial court – should "honour the memory of St. Peter the Apostle" and write to the bishop of Rome about the case; if the bishop of Rome – the court of second instance – decides that the case should be retried, then "let that be done, and let him appoint judges;" if the bishop of Rome decides that the case should not be retried, then he shall confirm the verdict.
: if a bishop is sentenced with deposition in a case by a verdict "of those bishops who have sees in neighbouring places," and if the deposed bishop "announce that his case is to be examined in the city of Rome," then the execution of the sentence is suspended, in that a replacement bishop shall not be ordained to the see of the deposed bishop until after the case has "been determined in the judgment of" the bishop of Rome.
: if a bishop is deposed from his office by bishops of his region acting as a court, and if the deposed bishop takes refuge with the bishop of Rome and seeks recourse by asking the bishop of Rome for a retrial, and if the bishop of Rome decides that the case should be retried; then the bishop of Rome may write to those bishops of a neighbouring province to investigate and conduct a retrial. The deposed bishop may ask the bishop of Rome to delegate priests to the retrial; at his discretion, the bishop of Rome can send priests acting as legates with his authority to serve as judges in cases where the bishop of Rome decides that the bishops of a neighbouring province alone are insufficient.
: if a bishop is "quick to anger" and excommunicates a priest or deacon hastily, then the priest or deacon has recourse by asking neighboring bishops, as a court of second instance, for a hearing and review of his case. Provision must be made that an innocent man be not condemned or deprived of communion with the Church; nevertheless, the priest or deacon will remain excluded from communion until his case is decided. A hearing should not be denied. The neighboring bishops, as a court of second instance, may either approve or revise the sentence. Since a bishop should not "suffer wrong or insult," if the neighboring bishops, as a court of second instance, "observe arrogance and pride" in the priest or deacon, then they may admonish the priest or deacon to obey "a bishop whose commands are proper and right." A bishop ought to manifest love and charity to his clergy, and ministers ought to obey their bishop.

Legacy
Both parties believed they had acted rightly: those of the East, because the Western bishops had insisted that Athanasius and Paul, whom they had deposed, should be accorded seats; and the Western bishops because of the retirement of those who had deposed them before the matter had been examined. The council failed entirely to accomplish its purpose.
The council did not universally represent the church and is not one of the ecumenical councils.

Two synodical letters were written: one to the clergy and faithful of Alexandria, the other to the bishops of Egypt and Libya.

The proposed explanatory revision of the Nicene Creed was rejected by the council.

The mutual anathematizations by the council and the counter-synod of Philippopolis led to the first schism between the Eastern Church and the Western Church.

See also
Council of Philippopolis

Notes

References

Works cited

 

 Translation taken from

Further reading 
Louis Duchesne, "Hist. ancienne de l'Eglise", II, 215
 J. Friedrich, Die Unechtheit der Canones von Sardika (Vienna, 1902)
Franz Xaver von Funk, "Die Echtheit der Canones von Sardica," Historisches Jahrbuch der Gorresgesellschaft, xxiii. (1902), pp. 497–5 16; ibid. xxvi. (1905), pp. 1–18, 255-274

External links 

Sardica
History of Sofia
340s in the Roman Empire
4th-century Christianity
Arianism